Praia Grande is the southernmost municipality in the Brazilian state of Santa Catarina. Despite its name (which means Great Beach in Portuguese), the city is landlocked.

References 

Municipalities in Santa Catarina (state)
Populated places established in 1958
1958 establishments in Brazil